WWJB (1450 AM, "103.9 The Boot") is an American radio station licensed to serve the community of Brooksville, Florida. The station, established in 1958 as WKTS, is currently owned and operated by Hernando Broadcasting Company, Inc. WWJB is also repeated on FM translators W222CI 92.3 FM Brooksville, Florida and W280DK 103.9 FM Spring Hill, Florida.

Programming
Until October 16, 2017, WWJB broadcast a full service news/talk radio format to the greater Hernando County, Florida, area. , weekday programming on the station included syndicated talk shows hosted by Jim Bohannon, Phil Hendrie, Neal Boortz, Sean Hannity, Clark Howard, and Michael Savage. Local weekday programming includes The Nature Coast Morning News, The Haywire Talk Show with Bob Haa, and The Bob Penrod Show. Weekend programming includes syndicated shows hosted by Larry Kudlow, Jerry Doyle, and Kim Komando. Local weekend programming includes a tradio program called Trading Post, a three-hour block of classic country music on Saturday, plus religious talk shows and local church services on Sunday morning.

On October 16, 2017, WWJB changed their format from news/talk to country, branded as "103.9 The Boot".

Station alumni
One of the station's notable alumni included George Lowe, who later became well known for his role as Space Ghost in Space Ghost Coast to Coast on Adult Swim. While living in Brooksville in the early-1970s, he began learning radio skills at WWJB. Mitch English from national television show The Daily Buzz started his broadcast career at the station in the early 1990s.

Previous logo

References

External links

WJB
Country radio stations in the United States
Radio stations established in 1958
Hernando County, Florida
1958 establishments in Florida